This article shows the rosters of all participating teams at the women's basketball tournament at the 2018 Commonwealth Games on the Gold Coast.

Group A

Australia

Canada

England

Mozambique

Group B

India

Jamaica

Malaysia

New Zealand

See also 
 Basketball at the 2018 Commonwealth Games – Men's team rosters

References

External links 
  – Gold Coast 2018 Commonwealth Games Basketball Coverage

rosters